The Football Association of Zambia is the governing body of association football in Zambia founded in 1929 and based at the "Football House" on Alick Nkhata Road in Lusaka, the country's capital.

Affiliated to CAF and FIFA in 1964 and COSAFA in 1997, it organizes the local league and the country's national team.

Executive committee
 President  Andrew Kamanga
 Vice President  Justin Mumba
 Treasurer  Rix Mweemba
 Member  Brenda Kunda
 Member  Lee Kawanu
 Member  Dr Joseph Mulenga
 Member  Elijah Chileshe
 Member  Kabaso Kapambwe
 Member  Blackwell Siwale (2016–17)

National teams

The association governs and controls the Zambian national men's and women's teams which represents the country in international association football. The men's national team was commonly known during the 1980s as the "KK 11" after Dr. Kenneth Kaunda ("KK"), the founder of Zambia who was its president from independence in 1964 until the shift to a democratic multiparty state in 1991 when it changed nicknames to the Chipolopolo or the "Copper Bullets".

The team has appeared in the final of the Africa Cup of Nations thrice, winning it once against Ivory Coast.

Coaching staff
 Assistant coach :  Avram Grant 
 Assistant coach :  Dabid Chilufya (March 2017–present)
 Goalkeeper coach :  Stephen Mwansa (March 2017–present)
 Technical Advisor :  Danny Kabwe (2016–present)
 Team Manager :  Chris Chibuye (March 2017–present) 
 Team Doctor :  George Magwende 
 Physiotherapist :  Davies Mulenga 
 Physiotherapist :  Gibson Chaloba

Notelist

References

External links
 
 Official Zambian Sports & Latest Football News Site
 Reference website
 Official profile (archived) at FIFA.com
 Profile at CAFOnline.com

National members of the Confederation of African Football
Football in Zambia
Sports organizations established in 1929